The 2014–15 PBA season was the 40th season of the Philippine Basketball Association. The season formally opened on October 19, 2014, and finished on July 17, 2015. The league continued to use the three-conference format, starting with the Philippine Cup. The Commissioner's Cup and the Governors' Cup were the second and third conferences for this season, respectively.

This was also the first season that the league had 12 regular teams. The two new teams were Kia Sorento and Blackwater Elite. Although the NLEX Road Warriors had been approved as an expansion team, their owners instead opted to buy the Air21 Express franchise.

The first event of the season was the 2014 PBA Expansion Draft in July, for expansion teams Blackwater Elite and Kia Sorento, followed by the 2014 PBA draft, held on August 24, 2014.

This season previously held the record for most games played overall in a season, having 257 games played throughout the whole year. It surpassed the previous record of 249 games, previously set during the 2012–13 season. This record was later broken the following season.

Board of governors

Executive committee
 Chito Salud (Commissioner) 
 Patrick Gregorio (Chairman, representing Talk 'N Text Tropang Texters)
 Robert Non (Vice-Chairman, representing San Miguel Beermen)
 Eric Arejola (Treasurer, representing GlobalPort Batang Pier)

Teams

Arenas

Like several Metro Manila-centric leagues, most games are held at arenas within Metro Manila, and sometimes, Antipolo. Games outside this area are called "out-of-town" games, and are usually played on Saturdays. Provincial arenas usually host one game, rarely two; these arenas typically host only once per season, but could return occasionally.

Main arenas

Out-of-town arenas
Aside from games outside Metro Manila and Antipolo, the PBA played two games outside the Philippines, in Dubai. It was the second time the league held games in the United Arab Emirates.

Transactions

Player movement
The expansion draft for incoming teams Blackwater Elite and Kia Sorento was held on July 18, 2014. Danny Ildefonso of the Meralco Bolts and Reil Cervantes of Barako Bull Energy were selected as the first picks of Blackwater and Kia respectively.

Retirement
January 9, 2015: Jimmy Alapag formally announced his retirement during a press conference at the Smart Araneta Coliseum prior to the second game of the 2014–15 PBA Philippine Cup Finals between the Alaska Aces and the San Miguel Beermen. However, he came out of retirement after nine months and played for two more seasons with the Meralco Bolts. He later retired for the second time during the end of the 2015–16 season.
May 18, 2015: Kerby Raymundo officially announced his retirement.

Coaching changes
July 9, 2014: Talk 'N Text Tropang Texters head coach Norman Black was moved to the Meralco Bolts, replacing Ryan Gregorio as head coach. Replacing Black in Talk 'N Text is assistant coach Jong Uichico.
August 2, 2014: Leo Austria was named as the head coach of the San Miguel Beermen. Coach Biboy Ravanes was demoted to assistant coach and active consultant Todd Purves will have a minimal role with the team.
October 18, 2014: Barako Bull Energy fired head coach Siot Tanquingcen. He was replaced by assistant coach Koy Banal
November 27, 2014: GlobalPort Batang Pier appointed assistant coach Eric Gonzales as the team's interim head coach, while former head coach Pido Jarencio was reassigned as the team's consultant.
January 5, 2015: Team manager Alfrancis Chua announced the reappointment of Ato Agustin as Ginebra head coach  after two conferences with Jeffrey Cariaso. Cariaso was then hired by Alaska as an assistant coach.
March 30, 2015: Barangay Ginebra San Miguel fired head coach Ato Agustin. He was replaced by assistant coach Frankie Lim.
March 31, 2015: GlobalPort Batang Pier reinstated consultant Pido Jarencio as the team's head coach. Interim head coach Eric Gonzales was relegated as the assistant coach.

Notable events

Pre-season
The PBA's developmental league held its annual draft at the PBA office in Libis, Quezon City on September 15. Moala Tautuaa was selected by the Cagayan Valley Rising Suns as the first pick of the draft.
Team officials of the San Mig Super Coffee Mixers announced that the team will be renamed as the Purefoods Star Hotshots starting this season's Philippine Cup.

Philippine Cup
 The league's opening ceremonies and the first two games of the elimination round at the Philippine Arena set the all-time indoor Philippine sports attendance record of 52,612.  
The Grand Slam championship ring ceremony of the Purefoods Star Hotshots (formerly known as the San Mig Super Coffee Mixers) was held on October 22, before the start of their game against the Alaska Aces.
The Purefoods Star Hotshots retired the jersey numbers of Rey Evangelista (#7) and Jerry Codiñera (#44) on November 9, 2014, before their game against Barangay Ginebra San Miguel. The team also wore retro style jerseys with similarities from their 1988 uniforms.

Commissioner's Cup
The Talk 'N Text Tropang Texters retired the jersey number of Jimmy Alapag during the halftime of the  All-Star Game in Puerto Princesa Coliseum, Palawan on March 5, 2015, where he was added as the 13th man of the South All-Stars.
Columbian Autocar Corporation (CAC) announced that they will change the moniker of their PBA team to Kia Carnival for the Commissioner's Cup.
On February 15, 2015, Commissioner Chito Salud announced during a press conference at the Mall of Asia Arena that he will resign as the commissioner of the league at the end of the 2014-15 season due to personal reasons. The board of governors, led by chairman Patrick Gregorio told the media that a replacement will be named before the end of the ongoing Commissioner's Cup. The replacement will be assigned as the deputy commissioner at the start of the Governors' Cup.
During the board of governors meeting on March 7, 2015, they have decided to restructure the league and create the president/chief executive officer position to manage the league's marketing, expansion and business related matters. The commissioner position (which will also be the league's chief operating officer) will handle the game-related matters. Outgoing commissioner Chito Salud has been named as the league's first president/CEO.

Governors' Cup
The Purefoods Star Hotshots silently dropped the "Purefoods" brand on their team name. The team will now be known as the "Star Hotshots". The team's new colors and uniforms debuted in their game against the NLEX Road Warriors last May 10.
On May 14, Basketball Coaches Association of the Philippines (BCAP) president and former PBA coach Chito Narvasa was named as the 9th commissioner of the league, replacing Chito Salud at the end of the 2014-15 season.

Liga ng Bayan
A set of preseason games named "Liga ng Bayan" was scheduled from September 12 to October 12 and were held on various cities around the country. The results of the games are as follows:

Opening ceremonies

The opening ceremonies for this season was held at the Philippine Arena in Ciudad de Victoria, Bocaue, Bulacan on October 19, 2014. The first games of the Philippine Cup, Kia vs Blackwater and Barangay Ginebra vs Talk 'N Text immediately followed.
The muses for the participating teams are as follows:

2014–15 Philippine Cup

Elimination round

Playoffs

Quarterfinals

1st phase 

|}*Team has twice-to-beat advantage. Team #1 only has to win once, while Team #2 has to win twice.

2nd phase

Semifinals 

|}

Finals 

|}
Finals MVP: Arwind Santos (San Miguel Beermen)
Best Player of the Conference: June Mar Fajardo (San Miguel Beermen)

2015 Commissioner's Cup

Elimination round

Playoffs

Quarterfinals 

|}

|}
*Team has twice-to-beat advantage. Team #1 only has to win once, while Team #2 has to win twice.

Semifinals 

|}

Finals 

|}
Finals MVP: Ranidel de Ocampo (Talk 'N Text Tropang Texters)
Best Player of the Conference: Jayson Castro (Talk 'N Text Tropang Texters)
Bobby Parks Best Import of the Conference: Wayne Chism (Rain or Shine Elasto Painters)

2015 Governors' Cup

Elimination round

Playoffs

Quarterfinals 

|}
*Team has twice-to-beat advantage. Team #1 only has to win once, while Team #2 has to win twice.

Semifinals 

|}

Finals 

|}
Finals MVP: June Mar Fajardo (San Miguel Beermen)
Best Player of the Conference: June Mar Fajardo (San Miguel Beermen)
Bobby Parks Best Import of the Conference: Romeo Travis (Alaska Aces)

Individual awards

Leo Awards

Most Valuable Player: June Mar Fajardo (San Miguel)
Rookie of the Year: Stanley Pringle (GlobalPort)
First Mythical Team:
Jayson Castro (Talk 'N Text)
Paul Lee (Rain or Shine)
Greg Slaughter (Barangay Ginebra)
June Mar Fajardo (San Miguel)
Arwind Santos (San Miguel)
Second Mythical Team:
Stanley Pringle (GlobalPort)
Terrence Romeo (GlobalPort)
Asi Taulava (NLEX)
Ranidel de Ocampo (Talk 'N Text)
Calvin Abueva (Alaska)
All-Defensive Team:
Chris Ross (San Miguel)
Chris Exciminiano (Alaska)
June Mar Fajardo (San Miguel)
Gabe Norwood (Rain or Shine)
Calvin Abueva (Alaska)
Most Improved Player: Terrence Romeo (GlobalPort)
Sportsmanship Award: June Mar Fajardo (San Miguel)

Awards given by the PBA Press Corps
 Scoring Champion: Terrence Romeo (GlobalPort)
 Baby Dalupan Coach of the Year:  Leo Austria (San Miguel)
 Mr. Quality Minutes: Calvin Abueva (Alaska)
 Bogs Adornado Comeback Player of the Year: Alex Cabagnot (San Miguel)
 Danny Floro Executive of the Year: Patrick Gregorio (Talk 'N Text)
 Defensive Player of the Year: June Mar Fajardo (San Miguel)
 Order of Merit: Paul Lee (Rain or Shine)
All-Rookie Team
Stanley Pringle (GlobalPort)
Chris Banchero (Alaska)
Jake Pascual (Barako Bull)
Matt Ganuelas-Rosser (Talk 'N Text)
Jericho Cruz (Rain or Shine)

Cumulative standings

Elimination rounds

Playoffs

References

External links
PBA Official Website

 
PBA